John's Island Presbyterian Church is a historic Presbyterian church located on Johns Island, Charleston County, South Carolina.  It was founded in 1719 by Rev Archibald Stobo, a Church of Scotland minister. It was remodeled in 1792 and extended in 1823.  It is a "T"-shaped, frame meeting house-style church sheathed in clapboard.

It was added to the National Register of Historic Places in 1975.

Gallery

References

Presbyterian churches in South Carolina
Churches on the National Register of Historic Places in South Carolina
Churches completed in 1719
Churches in Charleston, South Carolina
National Register of Historic Places in Charleston, South Carolina
18th-century Presbyterian church buildings in the United States
1719 establishments in the Thirteen Colonies